The Honda SS50 is  a  motorcycle manufactured by the Honda Motor Company.

Predecessors were the OHV C110/C11/C114 and OHC S50. Produced from 1961 onwards, the Honda 50 Sport (type C110 and C111) variant of the Super Cub, laid out the basics of all future models: It had a pressed-steel frame, hydraulic front and rear forks, a  OHV four-stroke engine. The cylinder was laid horizontally to optimise cooling. The final drive was chain running in an enclosed chain case. The S50 featured an all-new OHC alloy head engine.

The SS50 replaced these in the late 1960s, using a new T-shaped frame with separate rear mudguard, and telescopic front forks to replace the leading links.

SS50
The SS50 replaced the OHV C110 and derivatives, with the SS standing for "Super Sports". Basically with the same form as the S50, it had a few upgrades:

The first SS50s in the late 1960s, were delivered with chrome panelled tank, and frame painted in the same colour as the tank's paintwork. Later on they got a longer, thinner  petrol tank in  red, blue or yellow and a grey frame, and chromed mudguards. Introduced with a four-speed gearbox, the handlebar controls and switches corresponded to the high level of other Honda motorcycle models, made from cast aluminum, and a standard rear-view mirror. All three of these bikes came complete with a chromed high level exhaust and heat shield.

The later five-speed SS50 had an extra gear and the engine was also tuned up making it faster and more competitive in the UK market. The frames of the later five-speed models were black differing to the grey of the four-speed. 
The last five-speed versions had a front disc brake instead of the twin drums used earlier..

As a moped, to comply with the legal requirements in the United Kingdom and some other European countries, the SS50 was available with a pair of bicycle-like pedals. The special pedal cranks allowed both pedals to be rotated forward, so that the pedals would form motorcycle-style footrests in normal operation.

Competition
The Honda SS50 varied greatly from its competitors in using a four-stroke engine, its global competitors the Suzuki AP50 - A50II and the Yamaha FS1E "Fizzy" used two-stroke engines. This made the SS50 slower on acceleration, but more reliable and economical.

Related models
The SS50 49 cc engine was also used in numerous related models including the ST series (minibike) and the Z series "monkey".

In Vietnam
The Honda SS50 is commonly known as a Honda 67, later Honda 72 (SS50V 1972 model) in Vietnam, particularly in the South.

See also
Honda 70
Honda CL70
Honda Sport 90

References

Footnotes

Sources

SS50
Motorcycles introduced in the 1960s